Serga tsässon is a small Seto chapel situated in Serga village, Meremäe rural municipality in Võru County in Estonia.

General information
Serga tsässon is situated in the middle of the Serga village. The vicinity of the tsässon is used as a village square and has a swing, a flag post and some benches. Serga tsässon is dedicated to Saint Anastasia and the feast for this tsässon is on the 11 November (Nahtsipäev) (29 October according to Julian calendar). Tsässon is still used today. According to the data based on dendrochronological research, the probable time of building is 1784 (Läänelaid et al 2005). The building is not state-protected. It is in good condition. The tsässon got hit by a shrapnel shell during a battle in the War of Independence that shifted it off the stone foundation. Splinters and the damage they did can be seen today in the east and north wall of the building. During Nahtsipäev (11 November) in 2007, father Rafael re-inaugurated Serga tsässon after a thorough renovation. Local builders Ain Raal and Väino Järv replaced the lower beams, the floors, the ceilings and installed a new aspen shingle roof during the renovation. Serga tsässon was near to a new Taeluva church; therefore, the communication between the villagers and popes was frequent. Tsässon was actively used during Soviet times (Sillaots 2001).

Building data
Serga tsässon is a small, square one-storied pinewood cross-beam building with a gable roof; the dimensions of it are 565 x 438 cm. The building has one interior room (14.1 m2) and an outer shelter of 4.8 m2. The shelter is a construction supporting on six wooden posts, with a meter-high barrier made from vertical boards, the front edge has a gate about the same height. The building has walls made from round unhewn pine logs in the inside as well as on the outside, the height from the foundation up to where the wall and rafter are joined is 197 cm and up to the ridge 380 cm. The logs are tied in the corners by axe hewn backwards halving, that is typical for older log constructions in the region. The upper beams on the side walls are also quite remarkable, as the edges that extend over the wall are profiled by an axe. The building is standing on granite stones. For about 90 years, the building was off the stones and the lower logs were rotting. In 2007, it was raised on the stones again and the rotten logs were replaced by new ones. Half-beams that are axe-hewn on the top have been placed on the floor and rest on the slots in the front wall. The roof used to support on raising-plates and probably had a board-roof. By now all that is left is a raising-plate on the ridge and holes for former raising-plates in the head walls. The building has three pairs of rafters with roof boarding suitable for shingle roof fitted on it. A threefold aspen shingle-roof was installed on the tsässon during 2007 renovation. The door of the building (160 x 86 cm) is fixed on the hewn tender posts by forged hinges that are shaped like bird heads. The leaf of the door is made from boards fixed on the crosspiece and it opens on the inside. There is an old-time metal padlock, hasp and a clamp fixed on the door as well as an old-time forged handle with a ring. A millstone is used for a doorsill. There is a window with six panes in the eastern wall (45 x 64 cm). Signs of the place where a former cauldron hole (50 (w) x 30 (h) cm) can be seen next to the window.

References

Chapels in Estonia
Setomaa Parish
Buildings and structures in Võru County
Churches completed in 1784
18th-century establishments in Estonia